Albert Kevend (20 January 1883 Kambja Parish, Tartu County – July 1945 Karaganda Oblast, Russia) was an Estonian politician. He was a member of III Riigikogu. He was a member of the Riigikogu since 17 November 1926. He replaced Otto Pärlin. On 19 January 1927, he resigned his position and he was replaced by Artur Tupits.

References

1883 births
1945 deaths
Members of the Riigikogu, 1926–1929